Eileen MacDonagh was born in Geevagh, County Sligo in 1956 and has worked as a sculptor since the 1980s. For her contribution to sculpture and the Arts in Ireland, MacDonagh was elected in 2004 to Aosdána, the Irish organisation that recognises artists that have contributed a unique body of work.

Background
"Eileen MacDonagh's sculptures are candid, direct and ultimately rational. They spring from a harmonious and human-centered vision which seeks to charge natural materials with an aesthetic significance governed always by principles of clarity and formal coherence. Their major analogues derive from architecture and from craft... though never minimalist, the sculptures can sometimes be minimal, working to achieve a sort of meditative stillness where every details counts." —Medh Ruane.

MacDonagh's work has featured in many exhibitions, both in Ireland and abroad, including shows in Portugal, Scotland, India and Japan. Eileen has both organised and participated in the International Sculpture Symposium movement, in Ireland and abroad; her work is included in numerous collections, such as the Irish Office of Public Works (OPW), the Lough Boora Sculpture in the Parklands, Co. Offaly, Kilkenny and Cork County Councils, Marlay Park, Dublin and Tawara Newtown, Osaka, Japan.

MacDonagh works mainly in stone to produce large-scale sculptures. Due to the scale of her work, she has tended to concentrate on public art commissions although she has also exhibited in the context of the gallery exhibitions. She received a Diploma in Sculpture at the School of Art, Regional Technical College, Sligo, Ireland (1974–79) and an Art Teachers Certificate from the Limerick School of Art & Design (1979–80). MacDonagh's first solo exhibition in 1992,Truss, showed large-scale works made from both wood and stone. MacDonagh has continued through her career as a sculptor taking on large-scale projects, and has built up a large body of public art since across Ireland and in other countries.

Catherine Marshall, head of collections at Irish Museum of Modern Art, wrote in 2005 that:

"when MacDonagh talks about granite and limestone her language takes on a new dimension, introducing the listener to colour, texture, density and ultimately to the processes that working with them involve. 'Granite is the noblest of stones', she says, 'just the toughness of it. Every time you strike the stone you make fire. Granite is volcanic, it was born of fire and you need fire to form it.' She loves the challenge of working on a large scale, coaxing her vision out of unyielding, resistant stone. The circularity of the process, appeals to her sense of the invisible order that is a hall-mark of her work'."

MacDonagh is deeply influenced by books such as Robert Lawlor's Sacred Geometry and Fritjof Kapra's The Tao of Physics in which formal patterns are linked to ideas, religions and to the physical make-up of the universe. She has investigated the colour, texture and density of granite and limestone, as well as the challenge of working on a large scale. In recent years she has undertaken large-scale public works in stainless steel – The Medusa Tree (2009) for VISUAL, The Contemporary Art Centre, Carlow and  – The Tallaght Cross (2008).

Many of MacDonagh's sculptures examines a fascination with geometry. She has long been inspired by the purity and ubiquity of geometric principles and the way in which geometric rules govern the universe. Her 2008 Fire from Stone show at the Centre Culturel Irlandais featured four major installations, the largest of which was composed of fifteen pieces of differing size. The individual pieces were based on icosahedral forms, a complex geometric shape, and are carved from over ten different types of Indian granite. They ranged in size from 4-foot in diameter to just 4 inches, and were all created when MacDonagh was on a residency in India.

Career

In February 2012 MacDonagh will be showcasing new original works alongside past works in a Retrospective Exhibition of her work at VISUAL, the Centre for Contemporary Art, Carlow, Ireland. The show is called Lithosphere, opening 5 Feb 2012 at 3pm. This exhibition will be open on public display for 3 months

Awards and public art commissions
 2009 The Medusa Tree Commission VISUAL, the Centre for Contemporary Art, Carlow, Ireland
 2008 Commission, Tallaght Cross, Dublin, Ireland
 2006 Commission, Inst. Technology, Tralee, Co Kerry, Ireland
 2006 Commission, Innis Oirr, The Aran Islands, Co.Galway, Ireland
 2005 Comm. National Maritime College, Ringaskiddy, Co Cork, Ireland
 2004 Commission, Dromahair/Leitrim, Ireland
 2004 Elected as a member of Aosdana
 2001 Commission, The Pyramid, Lough Boora, Co. Offaly, Ireland
 2001 Commission, Kildavin, Co. Carlow, Ireland
 2000 Commission, John Roberts Square, St, Waterford, Ireland
 2000 Commission, Millennium Fountain, Boyle, Co.Roscommon, Ireland
 1999 Commission, Market Square, Tullamore, Co. Offaly, Ireland
 1998 Commission, Famine Stone, Eigse, Carlow, Ireland
 1997 Commission, Carrigtwohill, Co. Cork, Ireland
 1997 Commission, Dunlaoighre, Co. Dublin, Ireland
 1996 Commission, Kilkenny City, Ireland
 1995 Commission, Portlaoise, Co. Laois, Ireland
 1994 Commission, Mallow Road, Cork, Ireland
 1992 Commission, Dublin Corporation, Clanbrassil St., Dublin, Ireland
 1991 Commission, Regional Technical College, Athlone, Ireland
 1990+95 First Prize Sculpture, Iontas Exhibition, Sligo, Ireland
 1989 Commission, Dublin Castle, Ireland

Key solo exhibitions
 2008 Fire from Stone, Centre Culturel Irlandais, Paris
 2005 From Another Constellation, Model and Niland Gallery, Sligo, Ireland
 1992–1993 Truss Touring Exhibition Projects Arts Centre, Limerick City Art Gallery, Irelan

Collections
The following organisations have collections of MacDonagh's Public Art Sculpture work

Ireland
 Waterford Co. Council
 Carlow Co. Council
 Dun Laoghaire / Rathdown Co. Council
 Kilkenny Co. Council
 Cork Co. Council
 Mountmellick Library, Co. Laois
 Museum Park, Kiltimagh, Co. Mayo
 Harbour Board, Aberdeen, Scotland
 VEC Co. Sligo
 Letterfrack Centre, Co. Galway
 Dublin City Corporation, Co. Dublin
 Limerick City Corporation, Co. Limerick
 St. Patrick's Training College, Dublin
 OPW Dublin Castle
 Marley Park, Dublin
 Cork County Council

International
 Sendai : Peoples Park, Japan
 Tawara : Newtown, Osaka, Japan
 Regional : Technical College, Athlone
 Merzig, : Stones on the Border, Germany
 Gulbarga : India.

References

Sources
  Lane, Ann. 2010. By the Way – a selection of Public Art in Ireland, pp. 14, 64, 66, 122, 131, 168, 170, 173, 234, 282.
 Dunne, Aidan. 2008. Rare encounter with sculpture in the spotlight. Irish Times, 6 Feb.
 Kenny, Padraig. 2008. The French Connection. Sunday Tribune, 28 Sep p3.
 Dunne, Aidan, 2005. The Art of Geometry. Irish Times, 23 May, p. 10.
 Woods, Suzanne and Marshall, Catherine. 2005. Eileen MacDonagh: Another Constellation. Model Arts and Niland Gallery, Sligo, Ireland  . 24 pp.
 Anon. 2002. A Pyramid for Boora. Tribune, 21 Sep
 "A Landscape in Stone", Interview by Peter Murray, Irish Arts Review Volume 20, Number 2, Summer 2003. Retrieved 28 Jan 2010.
 Dunne, Aidan. 1992. Triumph of a Sculptural Purist. Sunday Tribune, 19 July.
 Anon. Dubliner's Diary, 10 July 1992.
 Anon. City Entertainer, Jul 1992.
 Project Press. 1992. Truss Project Arts Centre Ltd, Dublin, 32 pp. Essay by Medb Ruane. ISBN No. 1 872493 05 X.
 Sendai sculpture symposium catalogue, JAPAN, 1989.
 Die Spur Symposium, Lindabrunn, Austria.
 Sculpture Society Ireland. 1988. Meitheal Sculpture Symposium, Dublin.
 Collaboration, 1988. The Pillar Project, Dublin.

External links

 Eileen MacDonagh website
 Aosdana page
 Medusa tree construction
 Pyramid at Lough Boora Parklands, Co. Offaly

Living people
Aosdána members
Irish sculptors
People from Sligo (town)
1956 births
Alumni of the Institute of Technology, Sligo
Alumni of the Limerick School of Art and Design
Irish women artists
Irish contemporary artists